Eretmobrycon is a genus of characins found in Central and South America.

Species
There are currently 12 recognized species in this genus:
 Eretmobrycon bayano W. L. Fink, 1976
 Eretmobrycon brevirostris (Günther, 1860)
 Eretmobrycon dahli (Román-Valencia, 2000)
 Eretmobrycon ecuadorensis (Román-Valencia, Ruiz-C., Taphorn, Jiménez-Prado & García-Alzate, 2015) 
 Eretmobrycon emperador (C. H. Eigenmann & Ogle, 1907)
 Eretmobrycon gonzalezi (Román-Valencia, 2002)
 Eretmobrycon guaytarae (C. H. Eigenmann & Henn, 1914)
 Eretmobrycon miraensis (Fowler, 1945)
 Eretmobrycon peruanus (J. P. Müller & Troschel, 1845)
 Eretmobrycon scleroparius (Regan, 1908)
 Eretmobrycon simus (Boulenger, 1898)
 Eretmobrycon terrabensis (Meek, 1914)

References

Characidae
Taxa named by William Lee Fink